Kumothales is a monotypic butterfly genus of the family Nymphalidae. Its only species, Kumothales inexpectata, is found in the Democratic Republic of the Congo (the Kivu-Ruwenzori area), Uganda (from the south-western part of the country to Kigezi) and Rwanda.

References

Limenitidinae
Monotypic butterfly genera
Nymphalidae genera